John David Swanson (born 5 May 1940) is an Australian former cricketer and baseball player. He played 29 first-class cricket matches for Victoria between 1965/66 and 1970/71. He also played baseball for Victoria between 1964 and 1975 and Australia. He won the Claxton Shield batting title in 1967-1968 and won the Helms Award as MVP in 1968. He was an inaugural inductee in the Australian Baseball Hall of Fame in 2005.

See also
 List of Victoria first-class cricketers
 The 1965-66 Victorian District Cricket final

References

External links
 

1940 births
Living people
Australian cricketers
Victoria cricketers
Cricketers from Melbourne
Australian baseball players